Rašćane may refer to:

Places 

 Rašćane Gornje, a village near Zagvozd in Croatia
 Rašćani, Tomislavgrad, a village near Tomislavgrad in Bosnia and Herzegovina

Other 

 Rašćane Viaduct, a viaduct located on the motorway between Zagvozd and Ravča in Croatia